The Stadspark (City Park) is an urban public park in Groningen, The Netherlands. 

Inspired by the City Beautiful movement, in 1909 a local businessman founded an association in order to collect funds for a public park in the city. Construction of the park started in 1913 and was completed in 1926. Within the park an arboretum and a petting zoo can be found. There was a horse racing venue, but this has been closed in 2021 to allow for more concerts to be organised in the park.

Concerts

References 

Parks in Groningen (province)
Groningen (city)